Styphnolobium is a small genus of three or four species of small trees and shrubs in the subfamily Faboideae of the pea family Fabaceae, formerly included within a broader interpretation of the genus Sophora. It was recently assigned to the unranked, monophyletic Cladrastis clade. They differ from the genus Calia (mescalbeans) in having deciduous leaves and flowers in axillary, not terminal, racemes. The leaves are pinnate, with 9–21 leaflets, and the flowers in pendulous racemes similar to those of the black locust. Necklacepod is a common name for plants in this genus.

Etymology
From Greek styphno-, stryphno- "sour, astringent" and lobion "pod", because of the fresh pods' pulp taste.

Species
Styphnolobium comprises the following species:

Section Oresbios
 Styphnolobium affine (Torr. & A. Gray) Walp., the coralbean or Eve's necklace is native to the southern United States in Texas, Oklahoma, Arkansas and Louisiana. It is a large shrub or small tree, growing to 5–7 m tall, with white or pale violet flowers. The seeds of this species are believed to be poisonous. The sapwood leaches a yellow dye on contact with water.

 Styphnolobium burseroides M. Sousa & Rudd
 Styphnolobium caudatum M. Sousa & Rudd is native to Nicaragua.
 Styphnolobium conzattii (Standl.) M. Sousa & Rudd
 Styphnolobium monteviridis M. Sousa & Rudd is native to Central America.
 Styphnolobium parviflorum M. Sousa & Rudd
 Styphnolobium protantherum M. Sousa & Rudd
 Styphnolobium sporadicum M. Sousa & Rudd

Section Styphnolobium
 Styphnolobium japonicum (L.) Schott, the pagoda tree (Chinese Scholar, Japanese pagodatree; syn. Sophora japonica), is native to eastern Asia (mainly China; despite the name, it is introduced in Japan), is a popular ornamental tree in Europe, North America and South Africa, grown for its white flowers, borne in late summer after most other flowering trees have long finished flowering. It grows into a lofty tree 10–20 m tall with an equal spread, and produces a fine, dark brown timber.

Uses
The pagoda tree is widely used in bonsai gardening. The Guilty Chinese Scholartree was a historic pagoda tree in Beijing, on which the last emperor of the Ming Dynasty, Chongzhen, hanged himself.

Styphnolobium japonicum (Chinese: 槐; pinyin: huái; formerly Sophora japonica) is one of the 50 fundamental herbs used in traditional Chinese medicine.

References

External links

Styphnolobium japonicum (as Sophora japonica)
"Chinese Scholar Tree"
The Evil God in the Pagoda Tree Japanese folktale with the Pagoda Tree at hyakumonogatari.com

Faboideae
Fabaceae genera
Medicinal plants
Flora of the United States